Jayam may refer to:
 Jayam (1999 film), a Tamil film by Ravi Raja
 Jayam (2002 film), a Telugu film by Teja
 Jayam (2003 film), a Tamil film by M. Raja
 Jayam (2006 film), a Malayalam film by Sonu Sisupal

People with the given name
 Jayam Ravi